Free Radicals is an Austrian film.

Plot
Following the death of Manu (Resetarits) in a car accident, the film relates the interwoven stories of several people who become indirectly connected by the events and aftermath of the crash.

External links
Official website

2003 films
2000s German-language films
Austrian independent films